This is a list of active and extinct volcanoes in the Netherlands.

See also
 List of mountains and hills in the Netherlands

References

Netherlands
Volcanoes